The Dutch House is a late-17th-century house in New Castle in the U.S. state of Delaware. Built during New Castle's colonial period, the house currently serves a museum under the management of the New Castle Historical Society.

History 
The Dutch House was built in the late 17th century, between 1664 and 1682. It is often contested whether the Dutch House or the Ryves Holt House is the oldest home in the state of Delaware. Although the home is recorded as being built for a Dutch family, it was built using English methods during the English occupation (1663–1673) of the colony; this was not discovered until the home was undergoing restoration. The home is located across the street from the New Castle town green, and its doorstep is located below street level on account of the street's having been raised in the mid-18th century. The home was privately owned until 1937, when it was restored and put under the management of the New Castle Historical Society.

See also 
List of the oldest buildings in Delaware

References 

Historic house museums in Delaware
Houses completed in 1682